Jacques Hétu  (August 8, 1938 – February 9, 2010) was a Canadian composer and music educator.

Biography 
Jacques Hétu was born in Trois-Rivières, Quebec; he began his professional training at the University of Ottawa where he was a pupil of Jules Martel from 1955 to 1956. In 1956 he entered the Conservatoire de musique du Québec à Montréal and studied there for five years with Melvin Berman (oboe), Isabelle Delorme (harmony), Jean Papineau-Couture (fugue), Clermont Pépin (composition and counterpoint), and Georges Savaria (piano); he also studied at the Tanglewood Music Center during the summer of 1959 with Lukas Foss. In 1961 he won several important awards, including the first prize at the Quebec Music Festivals composition competition, a grant from the Canada Council, and the Prix d'Europe. The latter two awards enabled him to pursue studies in France at the École Normale de Musique de Paris from 1961 to 1963 with Henri Dutilleux and at the Paris Conservatory with Olivier Messiaen in 1962–1963.

Hétu joined the music faculty at Laval University in 1963, remaining there through 1977. He taught music composition at the University of Montreal in 1972–1973 and 1978–1979. From 1979 to 2000, he was a professor at the Université du Québec à Montréal, notably serving as the director of that school's Music Department from 1980 to 1982 and from 1986 to 1988.

Honours
He was nominated for a 1989 Juno Award in the Best Classical Composition category. In 1989, he was made a Fellow of the Royal Society of Canada and in 2001 he was made an Officer of the Order of Canada.

Death
Hétu died of lung cancer at his home in Saint-Hippolyte on February 9, 2010. He is survived by his wife, Jeanne Desaulniers, and five children.

On March 3, 2010 the Toronto Symphony Orchestra premiered his Fifth Symphony under the baton of TSO music director Peter Oundjian. It is not known whether this commission – his Op. 81 – was his last completed work.

References

1938 births
2010 deaths
Canadian male composers
Deaths from cancer in Quebec
Conservatoire de musique du Québec à Montréal alumni
Deaths from lung cancer
École Normale de Musique de Paris alumni
Fellows of the Royal Society of Canada
Musicians from Trois-Rivières
Officers of the Order of Canada
Officers of the National Order of Quebec
Academic staff of the Université du Québec à Montréal
Academic staff of Université Laval
University of Ottawa alumni
Academic staff of the Université de Montréal
Pupils of Lukas Foss
20th-century Canadian composers
20th-century Canadian male musicians